Ruslan Bakhtiyarovych Zeynalov (born 19 June 1982) is a Ukrainian former professional footballer.

Career
Zeynalov signed for Azerbaijan Premier League team Araz-Naxçıvan in October 2014. He left the club in November without making an appearance, after Araz withdrew from the league.

Honours
Individual
 Desna Chernihiv Player of the Year: 2009

References

External links
 
 
 

1982 births
Living people
Footballers from Luhansk
Ukrainian people of Azerbaijani descent
Ukrainian footballers
Association football midfielders
Ukrainian expatriate footballers
Expatriate footballers in Latvia
Expatriate footballers in Belarus
Expatriate footballers in Azerbaijan
FC Zorya Luhansk players
FK Rīga players
FC Stal Alchevsk players
FC Naftovyk-Ukrnafta Okhtyrka players
FC Krymteplytsia Molodizhne players
FC Desna Chernihiv players
FC Oleksandriya players
FC Belshina Bobruisk players
Araz-Naxçıvan PFK players